Unica Hija is a Philippine television drama science fiction series broadcast by GMA Network. Directed by Mark Sicat Dela Cruz, it stars Kate Valdez in the title role. It premiered on November 7, 2022 on the network's Afternoon Prime line up replacing Return to Paradise. The series concluded on March 3, 2023 with a total of 85 episodes. It was replaced by AraBella in its timeslot.

The series is streaming online on YouTube.

Cast and characters

Lead cast
Kate Valdez as Bianca "Bubbles" Sebastian / Hope Marasigan / Hope Sebastian / Fatima / Charity / Agape 

Supporting cast
 Katrina Halili as Diane "D" Sebastian
 Maybelyn dela Cruz as Cara Orosco-Rivas
Biboy Ramirez as Joselito "Jhong" Marasigan
Mark Herras as Zachary "Zach" Rivas
Boboy Garrovillo as Romualdo "Waldo" 
Bernard Palanca as Lucas Orosco 
Maricar de Mesa as Lorna Marasigan
Faith da Silva as Carnation Marasigan / fake Hope Marasigan
Athena "Rere" Madrid as Aica O. Rivas
Kelvin Miranda as Ralph S. Vergara
Jennie Gabriel as Trixie
Jemwell Ventenilla as Denver
Shanicka Arganda as Penny
Issa Litton as Tamara Saavedra-Vergara
Erin Ocampo as Elena 
Bing Pimentel as Hera "Mother Hera" Meneses
Arkel Mendoza as Mickey

Guest cast
Alfred Vargas as Christian Sebastian
Lilet as Melinda Rivas
Kzhoebe Nichole Baker as young Carnation Marasigan
Lyanne Bron as young Hope Marasigan
Therese Malvar as young Cara Orosco
Kych Minemoto as young Zachary Rivas
Shermaine Santiago as Gracia "G" Garcia
Patricia Tumulak as TV host

Production
Principal photography commenced on July 20, 2022.

Episodes

References

External links
 
 

2022 Philippine television series debuts
2023 Philippine television series endings
Cloning in fiction
Filipino-language television shows
GMA Network drama series
Philippine science fiction television series
Television shows set in the Philippines